Valerie Kay Henderson (born April 19, 1986) is an American soccer goalkeeper currently playing for the Western New York Flash of the National Women's Soccer League.

Attended Miramonte High School in Orinda, California where she played all 4 years on the Varsity Women's Soccer Team. She played four seasons as the starting goalkeeper for the UCLA women's soccer team from 2004 to 2007, and subsequently played at a professional level for Pali Blues, Los Angeles Sol and Philadelphia Independence plus Damallsvenskan side KIF Örebro before signing for the Atlanta Beat in 2012. Henderson was a member of the United States U-23 women's national soccer team. In the 2013 NWSL supplemental draft, Henderson was chosen in the third round, 31st overall, to play for the Western New York Flash in the inaugural NWSL season.

References

External links

 
 US Soccer profile
 Philadelphia Independence profile
 UCLA profile
 W-League player profile

1986 births
Living people
UCLA Bruins women's soccer players
Los Angeles Sol players
Pali Blues players
Philadelphia Independence players
USL W-League (1995–2015) players
Western New York Flash players
American women's soccer players
Women's association football goalkeepers
United States women's under-20 international soccer players
Damallsvenskan players
KIF Örebro DFF players
Miramonte High School alumni
Women's Professional Soccer players